John Gilbert Dauncey (9 April 1936 - 11 October 2021) was a former Welsh cricketer. He was a right-handed batsman who played for Glamorgan. He was born in Ystalyfera, in Glamorgan.

Gilbert Dauncey played league cricket for Swansea, Metal Box, Pontardawe, Clydach and Mumbles. He made two first-class appearances for Glamorgan, during the 1957 season, having represented the Second XI since 1954. From the opening order, Dauncey scored his first-class best total of 34 in his debut innings, against Gloucestershire. His second and final first-class appearance came immediately afterwards, against Kent.

References

External links
Gilbert Dauncey at Cricket Archive 

1936 births
Living people
Welsh cricketers
Glamorgan cricketers